Cyrtacanthacris tatarica, the brown-spotted locust, is a species of bird grasshopper in the family Acrididae. It is found in the Afrotropics and Indomalaya.

Subspecies
These subspecies belong to the species Cyrtacanthacris tatarica:
 Cyrtacanthacris tatarica abyssinica Uvarov, 1941
 Cyrtacanthacris tatarica tatarica (Linnaeus, 1758)

References

External links

 

Cyrtacanthacridinae